Parotocinclus halbothi is a species of catfish in the family Loricariidae. It is native to South America, where it occurs in the Trombetas River basin in Brazil, as well as the Maroni basin in Suriname. The type locality of the species is a shallow, clear, unvegetated stream with a mixed substrate composed of gravel, sand, and leaf litter, though the fish is reported to be most frequently seen in portions of the stream with a gravel substrate. This species is noted to coexist with a variety of other fishes in its environment, including the genera Aequidens, Apistogramma, Bryconops, Callichthys, Copella, Erythrinus, Gymnorhamphichthys, Helogenes, Hoplias, Laimosemion, Mastiglanis, Pyrrhulina, and Synbranchus. It reaches 2 cm (0.8 inches) SL.

References 

Loricariidae
Otothyrinae
Fish described in 2014
Freshwater fish of Brazil
Fish of Suriname